The Hum Honorary Phenomenal Serial Award is given by the Board of Directors of the Hum Television Network and Entertainment Channel (HTNEC) to the Hum Television Network most critically acclaimed and cult followed drama serial of the year. The recipients of this award are usually directors, producers, writers, main cast and technical crew of the production.

This is one of the Special Award given by the Channel directors to the work of exceptional achievements. All the categorized and organized special award is awarded annually during the ceremony.

Hum Honorary Phenomenal Serial Award incepted with the origin of first Awards, and it may not be awarded every year, it is one of the category that is only based on the special inaugurated work of the year, this award may have irregular wins.

Recipients

Following is the listing of the recipients of Hum Honorary Phenomenal Serial Award:

2010s

Note: The † symbol indicates a posthumous award.

See also

 Hum Awards
 1st Hum Awards

References

External links 
Official websites
 Hum Awards official website
Other resources
 

Hum Award winners
Hum Awards